Aqushela is a typical over-dimensioned reservoir located in the Tanqwa-Abergele woreda of the Tigray Region in Ethiopia. The earthen dam that holds the reservoir was built in 1999 by the Relief Society of Tigray.

Dam characteristics 
 Dam height: 11.5 metres
 Dam crest length: 456 metres
 Spillway width: 16 metres

Capacity 
 Original capacity: 810 000 m³
 Dead storage: 121 500 m³
 Reservoir area: 20.5 ha
These are the design values. In practice, the runoff from the catchment is largely insufficient to fill the reservoir, which serves only as shallow drinking pond for livestock.

Irrigation 
 Designed irrigated area: 50 ha
 Actual irrigated area in 2002: 0 ha

Environment 
The catchment of the reservoir is 13.5 km² large. The lithology of the catchment is Precambrian metamorphic rock. Land use is strongly dependent on lithology: soils on metamorphic black limestone are used for cropping, while those on the schist and slate formations are under savannah woodland. Lands on the green-reddish-gray metamorphic banded marl formation are used for settlements. Most common soil types are:
 in the metamorphic black limestone formation: Endoleptic Calcisol at the upper slope (plateau); Endoleptic Cambisol and Vertic Leptosol at the middle slope; Hypercalcic Calcisol at the footslopes and Grumic Vertisol at the lower slopes
 in the schist and slate formations: Leptosol both at the upper slope and at the foot slope positions; Regosol (Calcaric) over Hypercalcic Calcisol at the mid slope position and Fluvisol at the valley bottom
 in the green-reddish-gray metamorphosed banded marl: Leptic Calcisol at the upper slope, Haplic Calcisol at the foot slope, and Fluvisol at the valley bottom

References 

Reservoirs in Ethiopia
1999 establishments in Ethiopia
Tigray Region